Sangita Basfore  (born 12 July 1996) is an Indian women's international footballer who plays as a midfielder and SSB Women's FC in Indian Women's League and the India women's national football team.

Club career

West Bengal 
Sangita had featured for the West Bengal State Team before moving to Rising Student Club.

Rising Student Club 
On 2016, Sangita signed for the Indian Women's League side Rising Student Club based in Odisha

SSB Women's FC 
On 2018, Sangeeta signed for SSB Women's FC. On the 2018–19 Indian Women's League, SSB Women's qualified for the Semi-Finals by a comfortable 2–0 victory against Hans Women FC where Sangita scored a fabulous goal before they lost the semi-finals to Sethu FC on a big margin of 8–1. She ended up scoring 3 goals at the end of the season.

International career 
Sangita was selected for the India Women's U19 team at the age of 17. Sangeeta was called up for the Indian National Team at the age of 19 for the Olympics Tournament in 2016. Sangita scored her first international goal against Sri Lanka on 2019 SAFF Women's Championship in their group stage match which was held on 17 March 2019. Sangita had also captained the national side against Uzbekistan in the 2019 Turkish Women's Cup which they lost 0–1.

International goals

Honours

India
 SAFF Women's Championship: 2016, 2019
 South Asian Games Gold medal: 2016, 2019

Rising Students Club
 Indian Women's League: 2017–18

SSB Women
 Calcutta Women's Football League: 2019–20

References

External links 
Sangita Basfore at All India Football Association

	

Indian women's footballers
Living people
1996 births
People from Nadia district
Sportswomen from West Bengal
Footballers from West Bengal
India women's international footballers
India women's youth international footballers
Women's association football midfielders
South Asian Games gold medalists for India
South Asian Games medalists in football
Indian Women's League players
21st-century Indian women
21st-century Indian people